Bilby is a 2018 American computer-animated short film written and directed by Liron Topaz, Pierre Perifel and JP Sans in their directorial debuts, and produced by DreamWorks Animation. It centers on a bilby trying to protect an albatross chick from the dangers of the Australian Outback.

A product of DreamWorks' newly created shorts program, it is based on the studio's feature film Larrikins by ToonBox Entertainment.

Plot
In the Australian Outback, a timid bilby tries to search for food while surviving the harsh environment and evading the deadly predators that live in it. One day, the bilby comes across an abandoned baby albatross turned on its head. Taking pity on the chick, the bilby flips over the chick, which grows attached to him. The bilby wants nothing to do with the chick, but he can't help but abandon his mission to find more food in order to save the chick from all kinds of predators. Time and again, he tries to leave the chick in a new environment, only to find himself constantly trying to survive a wide variety of dangerous situations.

Finally, the bilby and chick stop at an extremely high and steep cliffside that frequently experiences gusts of rising wind. The exhausted bilby decides to leave the chick there, especially since he believes she's ready to fly on her own, only for her to get snatched by a white-bellied sea eagle. Fearful for his new friend's safety, the bilby gains the courage to jump from the cliff and attack the eagle. During this battle, the chick falls from its talons, leading the bilby to free-fall through the air and clutch her. The bilby tosses the chick safely onto the cliff's edge, while he keeps falling and gets blown back up by an updraft. The two friends embrace, and the chick is happy that she can finally fly. The film ends in a flash-forward to the now-grown albatross landing on the cliffside, where she and her friend now live with an ample supply of food.

Voice cast
Dee Bradley Baker as Baby Albatross
David P. Smith as Bilby (Perry)

Production

Larrikins
In June 2013, it was announced that Tim Minchin would compose the music and score for Larrikins, which was based on an original concept from screenwriter Harry Cripps. The film followed a desert-dwelling bilby named Perry who leaves his home under a rock to go on a road trip with a music band in Australia. In June 2016, it was announced that Minchin and Chris Miller were to direct the film while Margot Robbie, Hugh Jackman, Naomi Watts, Rose Byrne, Ben Mendelsohn, Jacki Weaver, Josh Lawson, Damon Herriman, and Ewen Leslie were announced to voice characters. The film was slated to be released on February 16, 2018. Illustrator Peter de Sève was one of the first artists brought onboard the film and helped design several characters. In March 2017, Minchin announced on his personal blog that the project had been cancelled. Minchin wrote on his blog:

Resurrection
The film was brought back as a short, as part of the studio's newly announced shorts program. Bilby'''s three directors had worked together on the Larrikins animation team; Perifel served as head of character animation, Topaz as a lead animator, and Sans as a character supervisor.Bilby proved to be a testing ground for various new animation software, including Moonray, a light rendering engine that was used on DreamWorks' feature films beginning with How to Train Your Dragon: The Hidden World.

ReleaseBilby had its world premiere on June 16, 2018, as part of the closing ceremonies for the 2018 Annecy International Animated Film Festival. On December 21, 2018, the short was released on DreamWorks' official YouTube channel. In November 2020, however, it was no longer available as the Youtube video was set to "Private".Bilby, along with Bird Karma, was included on home video releases of How to Train Your Dragon: The Hidden World on May 21, 2019.

ReceptionBilby'' received the Jury's Choice Award at the 45th SIGGRAPH conference, as well as the Audience Award at the Palm Springs International Festival of Short Films.

References

2018 films
2018 computer-animated films
2010s American animated films
2010s animated short films
Computer-animated short films
DreamWorks Animation animated short films
Films set in the Outback
Films scored by Benjamin Wallfisch
Animated films without speech
Universal Pictures animated films
Universal Pictures short films
Animated films about birds
Animated films about animals